Cinder Ellen up too Late is a musical burlesque written by Frederick Hobson Leslie (writing under the pseudonym A. C. Torr) and W. T. Vincent, with music arranged by Meyer Lutz from compositions by Lionel Monckton, Sidney Jones, Walter Slaughter, Osmond Carr, Scott Gatti, Jacobi, Robertson, and Leopold Wenzel.  Additional lyrics were written by Basil Hood.  The show was a burlesque of the well-known pantomime and fairy tale, Cinderella.

The piece was first produced in Melbourne, Australia at the Princess's Theatre on 22 August 1891 and then in Sydney, on 5 October at the Theatre Royal.  It then debuted in London at the Gaiety Theatre in London and ran from 24 December 1891 until 9 July 1892, a total of 181 performances. It was revised and revived later in 1892.  The production was directed by Walter Raynham, with choreography by Katti Lanner and Willie Warde and costumes by Wilhelm.  Nellie Farren created the title role in Australia; in London the part was played by Kate James and then Letty Lind. The piece was re-written during the run; some characters were dropped and new ones were introduced. The cast included Sylvia Grey as Linconzina and Florence Levey as Fettalana (the stepsisters), E. J. Lonnen as Prince Belgravia, Arthur Williams as Sir Ludgate Hill, and Fred Leslie as "a servant".  Adelaide Astor had the small role of Templina and later the larger one of Fettalana, and Topsy Sinden danced in the piece.  Lottie Collins sang her sensationally popular song, "Ta-ra-ra Boom-de-ay" as an interpolation in the show every evening.

The title was a "playful allusion" to the real first name, Ellen, of the Gaiety's famous star, Nellie Farren.  After the company's return from Australia, and before the opening of Cinder Ellen in London, Farren experienced an attack of rheumatic fever which aggravated her spinal disease.  She had to withdraw from the London production of Cinder Ellen.  Her illness progressively crippled her, and Farren rarely performed after this.  Farren's withdrawal left Kate James to open in the title role in London.

Background
This type of burlesque was popular in Britain at the time. Other examples include The Bohemian G-yurl and the Unapproachable Pole (1877), Blue Beard (1882), Ariel (1883, by F. C. Burnand), Galatea, or Pygmalion Reversed (1883), Little Jack Sheppard (1885), Monte Cristo Jr. (1886), Miss Esmeralda (1887), Frankenstein, or The Vampire's Victim (1887), Mazeppa, Faust up to Date (1888), Ruy Blas and the Blasé Roué (1888), Carmen up to Data (1891) and Don Juan (1892, with lyrics by Adrian Ross).

John Hollingshead had managed the Gaiety Theatre from 1868 to 1886 as a venue for variety, continental operetta, light comedy, and numerous musical burlesques composed or arranged by the theatre's music director, Wilhelm Meyer Lutz. Hollingshead called himself a "licensed dealer in legs, short skirts, French adaptations, Shakespeare, taste and musical glasses." In 1886, Hollingshead ceded the management of the theatre to George Edwardes, whom he had hired in 1885. Edwardes expanded the burlesque format from mostly one-act to full-length pieces, generally with original music by Lutz instead of scores compiled from popular tunes. Nellie Farren starred as the "principal boy" at the Gaiety for over 20 years. She was joined in 1885 by Fred Leslie, who played comic characters and wrote many of its pieces under his pseudonym, "A. C. Torr".  In the early 1890s, as Burlesque went out of fashion, Edwardes changed the focus of the theatre from musical burlesque to the new genre of Edwardian musical comedy.

Characters and casts
The following list shows the names of the 1891 London cast, followed by the names of the 1892 cast:

Cinder-Ellen – Kate James;  Letty Lind
Linconzina – Sylvia Grey; Katie Seymour
Fettalana – Florence Levey; Adelaide Astor
Mrs. Kensington Gore – Emily Miller; Miss Holmes
Lord Taplow – Maud Hodson; Florence Lloyd
Lord Eastbourne – Blanche Massey; Ethel Earle
Lord Soho – Hetty Hamer; Louie Pounds
Mrs. Bayswater – Miss Kate Welwyn (1892 only)
Sir Peterborough Court – Violet Durkin; Maud Boyd
Lord Whitefriars – Miss Dunville; Miss Farrington (called Lord Blackfriars in 1892)
Sir Waterloo Bridge – Miss Norton; Lily Harold
Catherina – Lilian Price
Grazina – Maud Wilmot; Alice Gilbert
Furnivalzina – Violet Monckton
Griffina – Eva Greville; Bob Robina
Templina – Adelaide Astor; Miss Maud
Victorina – Lily McIntyre; Topsy Sinden
Pages (1892 only) – Phoebe Carlo and Lilian Sedgewick
Prince Belgravia – E. J. Lonnen; Maggie Duggan
Sir Ludgate Hill –  Arthur Williams; Charles Danby
Lord Leatherhead (1892 only) – Fred Storey
Charles Hollywell (1892 only) – Arthur Playfair
Peckham – Mr. Harris; Mr. Barry
Gnorwood – Mr. Walker; E. D. Wardes
Footman – Mr. Hill (both productions)
A Servant – Fred Leslie (both productions)

Notes

References
Adams, William Davenport.  A dictionary of the drama (1904) Chatto & Windus
Hollingshead, John.  Good Old Gaiety: An Historiette & Remembrance (1903)  London:Gaiety Theatre Co

External links
Information about Cinder-Ellen
Information about various versions of Cinderella
Information about the Melbourne production
Information about other 1891 productions
Information about Burlesque from the PeoplePlay UK website
Poster and further information from the PeoplePlay UK website

Musicals by Meyer Lutz
1891 musicals
West End musicals
Musicals based on secular traditions